The butterfly subtribe Euptychiina (Lepidoptera: Nymphalidae) is a diverse group within the tribe Satyrini, occurring throughout Central and South America, in addition to a few species known from North America. Euptychiina is a predominantly lowland group, with the exception of one Asian taxon Palaeonympha opalina Butler, 1871 and the Andean genus Forsterinaria Gray, 1973. The taxon was erected by Lee Denmar Miller.

Euptychiina 
Despite its members being common, this subtribe has been a challenging subject for taxonomic and phylogenetic studies for many years because of their dull coloration, intraspecific variation, lack of clear morphological characters, and morphological homogeneity. However, with the exception of pioneering work by W. Forster and L. D. Miller, the group received little attention from butterfly researchers until recently due to their typically dull brownish coloration. Currently, 50 genera and over 400 described species are recognized within this subtribe, but the group is estimated to contain over 500 species in 70 genera. The current classification of Euptychiina is based on the Lamas checklist, who retained and reorganized many of the genera erected by Forster. Forster described 33 euptychiine genera that are now widely accepted, but since he erected these genera without testing monophyly and synapomorphies, many of his genera have been recovered as polyphyletic or paraphyletic in recent molecular phylogenetic studies.

History of classification 
A. Butler was probably the first to propose a systematic classification for many euptychiine taxa, excluding species now in the "Taygetis clade". In his monograph of Euptychia (then used as a catch-all genus to include most euptychiine species), Butler divided the genus into seven groups (Division I to VII). Subsequently, Butler proposed an updated classification for the group and recognized 27 "species groups" within Euptychia sensu Butler (1867). G. Weymer recognized 29 "species group" within Euptychia sensu Butler, in addition to treating Taygetis and Amphidecta in his monograph of Satyridae in the "Macrolepidoptera of the American Faunistic region" by A. Seitz. Based on Weymer (1911)'s classification, Forster (1964) introduced 33 euptychiine genera and his classification is largely retained in Lamas (2004), a work considered as a vital foundation regarding Neotropical butterfly classification. The recent years have seen an explosion of interest in euptychiine systematics, resulting in many changes in generic classification of the group as well as improvement in our understanding of its species diversity. Although the subtribal name was first introduced by L. D. Miller when he treated Euptychiina as a tribal level taxon "Euptychiini", the genus Euptychia Hübner, 1818 was historically used to place many euptychiine species now no longer classified in that genus, perhaps explaining why the generic name Euptychia was used in a much broader sense to include many other euptychiine species. Consequently, Forster included this name "Euptychia" as part of new generic names he described, a trend also followed when the new generic name Atlanteuptychia was introduced for Euptychia ernestina Weymer, 1911. However, other recently described euptychiine genera do not follow this trend (references above).

Biology 
There exist detailed early stage biology (i.e. complete life cycle documented) information for 30 euptychiine species. Larva of euptychiine species often lack body scoli and possessing short head scoli and caudal filaments, but there exist some variation. Hostplant records are known for approximately 100 species, those records are mainly grass and bamboo species, although the genus Euptychia is known to feed on mosses and lycopsids.

Generic classification and species accounts (as of February 2019)

References 

 
Lepidoptera subtribes